Tate Lohr Wildlife Management Area, is located in Mercer County near the community of Oakvale, West Virginia.

The WMA is accessed from Pigeon Creek Road south of Oakvale off U.S. Route 460.

Hunting

Hunting opportunities in Tate Lohr WMA include deer,  grouse, raccoon, squirrel, and turkey. Hunting opportunities are limited by the small size of the WMA.

Camping is not allowed in the WMA.

See also

Animal conservation
Hunting
List of West Virginia wildlife management areas

References

External links
West Virginia DNR District 4 Wildlife Management Areas
West Virginia Hunting Regulations
West Virginia Fishing Regulations

Wildlife management areas of West Virginia
Protected areas of Mercer County, West Virginia
IUCN Category V